Sardar Atif Hussain Khan Mazari (18 February 1972 – 27 May 2020) was a Pakistani politician who was a Member of the Provincial Assembly of the Punjab, from January 2009 to May 2018.

Early life and education
He was born on 18 February 1972 in Rojhan. He had matriculation level education.

Political career
Mazari was elected to the Provincial Assembly of the Punjab as a candidate for the Pakistan Muslim League (N) (PML-N) from Constituency PP-250 (Rajanpur-IV) in by-polls held in January 2009. He received 31,209 votes and defeated an independent candidate, Zahid Khan Mazari.

He was re-elected to the Provincial Assembly of the Punjab as a PML-N candidate from Constituency PP-250 (Rajanpur-IV) in the 2013 Pakistani general election.

In December 2013, he was appointed Parliamentary Secretary for literacy and non-formal basic education.

Death
He died on 27 May 2020.

References

1972 births
2020 deaths
Punjab MPAs 2013–2018
Punjab MPAs 2008–2013
Pakistan Muslim League (N) politicians
People from Rajanpur District